Remi Drieux, Latinized Remigius Driutius (1519–1594) was the first bishop of Leeuwarden and the second bishop of Bruges.

Early life and legal career
In 1519 Drieux was born in Volckerinckhove, County of Flanders (now in Nord-Pas-de-Calais, France), the son of Remi Drieux and Catherine Fenaerts. He studied civil law and canon law at Leuven University, graduating doctor of both laws and in 1544 becoming professor of civil law. In 1557 he was appointed to the Great Council of Mechelen, the highest law court in the Habsburg Netherlands.

Episcopal career
In 1560 Drieux was named first bishop of the newly founded diocese of Leeuwarden, his appointment confirmed in 1561. He never took possession of his see, and in 1569 was translated to Bruges. On 13 November 1569 he received episcopal consecration in Mechelen from Maximilien de Berghes, archbishop of Cambrai, assisted by Cornelius Jansen and Franciscus Sonnius.

In the night of 28–29 October 1577, while in Ghent for a meeting of the States of Flanders, Drieux was placed under arrest together with several other leading opponents of the Dutch Revolt, including the bishop of Ypres, Martin Rythovius. In 1579 he attempted to escape from captivity but was recaptured. He was released on 14 August 1581, as part of a prisoner exchange, and spent time as a refugee in Tournai, Kortrijk, and Oudenaarde. In 1584 he was able to return to Bruges and resume his functions as bishop.

He died in Bruges on 12 May 1594.

References

1519 births
1594 deaths
Academic staff of the Old University of Leuven
Bishops of Bruges
16th-century Roman Catholic bishops in the Holy Roman Empire